Millom is a railway station on the Cumbrian Coast Line, which runs between  and . It is owned by Network Rail and managed by Northern Trains.

It was originally opened by the Whitehaven and Furness Junction Railway on 1 November 1850 as Holborn Hill. The station's name was changed to Millom for Holborn Hill on 1 August 1866, and Millom during the 1890s.

Until 1968, there was a short goods-only branch from here to the ironworks at Hodbarrow. This was abandoned after the works closed but the disused trackbed can still be seen from passing trains, whilst the old works site is now a nature reserve.

The station buildings also house Millom Heritage Museum And Visitor Centre (which runs the rail ticket office) and a small workshop offering furniture restoration.

Facilities
The booking office operates on a part-time basis (07:00–15:00, Mondays through Saturdays); outside these times tickets can be purchased from a vending machine on the southern side (as Northern have installed these at all stations on the route that didn't previously have them). Information screens and posters provide train running details for passengers. Both platforms have separate step-free access and are linked via a footbridge.

Services

Monday to Saturdays, there is generally an hourly service southbound to Barrow-in-Furness and northbound to Carlisle (one terminates at ) - however there is no service northbound after 21:00, with the last few trains from Barrow terminating here.

Northern introduced a Sunday service from the station (for the first time since 1976) from the summer 2018 timetable change.  This runs broadly hourly from mid-morning until early evening.

References

External links

 
 

Railway stations in Cumbria
DfT Category F1 stations
Former Furness Railway stations
Railway stations in Great Britain opened in 1850
Northern franchise railway stations
Millom